Houma is a village in Tongatapu, Tonga. It contains Mapu a Vaea. It had a population of 2086 in 2016.

References

Populated places in Tonga
Tongatapu